The Two Rivers is a  river in Kittson County, northwestern Minnesota, in the United States. Formed by the North Branch of the Two Rivers and the South Branch of the Two Rivers, it is a tributary of the Red River of the North, with its outflow traveling north through Lake Winnipeg and the Nelson River to Hudson Bay.

It runs entirely within Kittson County. It passes the town of Greenbush before entering Kittson County and passing the town of Lake Bronson. At Hallock, the Middle Branch enters from the east. The  section of the South Branch downstream from the Middle Branch is shown on federal topographic maps as the main stem of Two Rivers.

See also
List of rivers of Minnesota

References

Minnesota Watersheds

USGS Hydrologic Unit Map - State of Minnesota (1974)

Rivers of Kittson County, Minnesota
Rivers of Minnesota
Tributaries of Hudson Bay